Muchachos de la ciudad is a 1937 Argentine film directed and written by José A. Ferreyra.

Cast
 Carlos Dante
 Salvador Arcella - Lisandro (as S. Arcella)
 Antonio Ber Ciani - Malamuzza
 Floren Delbene - Julio Eduardo

External links

1937 films
1930s Spanish-language films
Argentine black-and-white films
1930s Argentine films